Paul Dösch (born 11 May 1998) is a German field hockey player who plays as a defender for Bundesliga club Berliner HC and the Germany national team.

Club career
Dösch played in the youth ranks of Berliner HC until 2010, when he switched to Blau-Weiss Berlin. In 2019 he returned to Berliner HC.

International career

Junior national team
Dösch made his debut for the German under-21 team in 2017. His first appearance was during a test series against the Netherlands in Mönchengladbach, Germany. Later that year he won a bronze medal with the junior team at the EuroHockey Junior Championship in Valencia, Spain.

His final year with the junior team was 2019. He made multiple appearances throughout the year, competing in numerous test matched and at an eight-nations tournament in Madrid, Spain. He finished his junior career on a high, winning gold at the EuroHockey Junior Championship in Valencia, Spain.

Die Honamas
Dösch made his debut for Die Honamas in 2021, during season two of the FIH Pro League.

References

External links
 
 

1998 births
Living people
German male field hockey players
Male field hockey defenders
Men's Feldhockey Bundesliga players
21st-century German people
Place of birth missing (living people)